Capparis pachyphylla is a species of plant in the family Capparaceae. It is endemic to India.

References

pachyphylla
Flora of Arunachal Pradesh
Endangered plants
Taxonomy articles created by Polbot